Pyotr Petrovich can refer to:

Pyotr Vershigora (1905–1963), Soviet writer
Pyotr Sokolov (footballer) (1890–1971), Russian soccer player
Pyotr Sokolov (painter) (1821–1899), Russian painter and illustrator 
Pyotr Shirshov (1905–1953), Soviet oceanographer, hydrobiologist, polar explorer, statesman, academician, and Hero of the Soviet Union
Peter Troubetzkoy (1822–1892), Russian diplomat, administrator and general
Pyotr Schmidt (1867–1906), a leader of the Sevastopol Uprising during the Russian Revolution of 1905.
Pyotr Semyonov-Tyan-Shansky (1827–1914), Russian geographer and statistician, managed Russian Geographical Society
Peter Lacy (1678–1751), Russian imperial commander
Pyotr Vasilevsky (born 1956), retired Belarusian professional football coach and player
Pyotr Glebov (1915–2000), Russian film and stage actor
Pyotr Shilovsky (1871–1924), Russian count, jurist, statesman, governor of Kostroma (1910–1912) and Olonets Governorate (1912–1913), inventor of the gyrocar
Pyotr Suvchinsky (1892–1985), Ukrainian artistic patron and writer on music
Peter von Glehn (1835–1876), Russian botanist of Baltic German origin
Pyotr Konchalovsky (1876–1956), Russian painter, member of Jack of Diamonds group
Grand Duke Pyotr Petrovich (1715–1719), son of Peter the Great and Catherine I of Russia